Allegro is a 2005 Danish film directed by Christoffer Boe, who also wrote the screenplay together with Mikael Wulff. It is Christoffer Boe's second film as a director. It features Ulrich Thomsen and former model Helena Christensen.

Plot 
Zetterstrøm (Ulrich Thomsen) once had a love affair with a woman (Helena Christensen), then left her and forgot all about his past, in favour of his musical career. While he is away from Copenhagen, a supernatural incident occurs, making the central part of Copenhagen inaccessible, over time it becomes impossible to enter the area due to some invisible shield. When Zetterstrøm returns to Copenhagen, he is oblivious to this incident and is guided by a mysterious man (Henning Moritzen) into the zone. Inside the zone, Zetterstrøm must re-experience his unresolved and traumatic love affair.

Cast 
 Zetterstrøm -- Ulrich Thomsen
 Andrea -- Helena Christensen
 Tom -- Henning Moritzen
 Alex in the Zone -- Nikolaj Lie Kaas
 Morten -- Jon Lange
 Terence Sander -- Nicolas Bro

Production 
The film was shot in Copenhagen, Denmark and in Manhattan, New York, United States.

Soundtrack 

1. From Concerto for Piano and Orchestra no.5, BWV 1056 in F minor/f-Moll/en fa mineur
II – Largo (3’ 00)

2. From Concerto for Piano and Orchestra no.1, BWV 1052 in D minor/d-Moll/en ré mineur
I – Allegro (7’ 45)

3. From Concerto for Piano and Orchestra no.3, BWV 1054 in D major/D-Dur/en ré majeur
II – Adagio e piano sempre (6’ 09)

4. From Concerto no.3, BWV 974 (After Alessandro Marcello, Oboe Concerto opus 1, in D minor/d-Moll/en ré mineur)
II – Adagio (5’ 03)

5. Aria from Goldberg Variations, BWV 988 (3’ 07) From The Well-Tempered Clavier, book 1 (Das Wohltemperierte Klavier, Teil 1) (le Clavier bien tempéré, livre 1)

6. Prelude no.1, BWV 846 in C major/C-Dur/en do majeur (2’ 00)

7. Prelude no.2, BWV 847 in C minor/c-Moll/en do mineur (1’ 30)

8. Prelude no.3, BWV 848 in C sharp major/Cis-Dur/en do dièze majeur (1’ 14)

9. Fuge no.8, BWV 853 in D sharp minor/dis-Moll/en ré dièze mineur (5’ 52)

10. Prelude no.20, BWV 865 in A minor/a-Moll/en la mineur (0’ 56)

11. Inventio no.1, BWV 772 in C major/C-Dur/en do majeur (1’ 18)

12. Inventio no.6, BWV 777 in E major/E-Dur/en mi majeur (2’ 36)

13. Inventio no.8, BWV 779 in F major/F-Dur/en fa majeur (0’ 51)

14. Sinfonia no.5, BWV 791 in E flat major/Es-Dur/ en mi bémol majeur (2’ 22)

15. Gnomenreigen (Dance Of The Gnomes)

All the music by Johann Sebastian Bach, except "Gnomenreigen" by Franz Liszt.
Complementary music by Anders Remers and Morten Green.

References

External links 
 
 Official Web Site
 Allegro at the 2nd edition of Venice Days (62nd Venice International Film Festival)

2000s romance films
2005 films
2000s Danish-language films
Films directed by Christoffer Boe
Danish romance films